Nirmali railway station is a  broad Metre Gauge railway station in Supaul district, Bihar. Its code is NMA. The station consists of 3 platforms. It serves Nirmali city.  The platform is  well sheltered. It has many facilities including water and sanitation. The station lies on Darbhanga–Nirmali metre-gauge line and line between Saraygarh – Nirmali Meter Gauge Line is being under construction.

Major train

 (05548) Saharsha - Laheriyasarai DMU
 (05547) Laheriyasarai - Saharsha DMU
 (05544) Saharsha - Laheriyasarai DMU
 (05543) Laheriyasarai - Saharsha DMU
 (05546) Saharsha - Laheriyasarai DMU
 (05547) Laheriyasarai - Saharsha DMU

References

Railway stations in Supaul district
Samastipur railway division